Capitals is a serif font composed entirely of capital letters. Uppercase keystrokes produced normal capitals, while lowercase produced a small caps variant. Capitals was one of the available operating system fonts that could be applied to the Macintosh operating system using the Appearance Manager.

Apple Inc. typefaces
Serif typefaces